Lucienne Bisson (6 July 1880 – 14 August 1939) was a French artist.

Bisson was born in Paris. She was the illegitimate daughter of Pierre-Auguste Renoir (1841 – 1919) and Frédérique Vallet-Bisson (1862 – 1948), a French painter who was leading the Société Féminine des Artistes.

Lucienne Bisson exhibited her works in many French Salons, among them the Salon des Indépendants. She is famous for her Paris city views, beautiful landscapes and colorful still lifes. For instance, Bisson made a painting that captured the "heavy atmosphere" on a cloudy Paris street in 1920s.

She died in August 1939, roughly one year before Nazi Germany occupied France during the World War II conflict. Her mother continued on living and managed to outlive Lucienne by 9 years (Frédérique died in 1948).

Notes

References

External links
 Artnet Photos d'oeuvres de Lucienne Bisson

Painters from Paris
1880 births
1939 deaths
French women painters
20th-century French painters
20th-century French women artists
19th-century French women artists